The 2022 Liga 3 South Kalimantan is the fifth edition of Liga 3 South Kalimantan organized by Asprov PSSI South Kalimantan.

Followed by 11 clubs. The winner of this competition will immediately advance to the national round.

Persemar is the defending champion after winning it in the 2021 season.

Teams

First round

Group A

Grup B

Grup C

Second round

Group D

Group E

Knockout stage

References

Liga 3
Liga 3 (Indonesia)
Sport in South Kalimantan